Les Hayes nicknamed "Buller" was an Australian professional rugby league footballer who played in the 1920s.  He played for Balmain and Western Suburbs as a second rower.

Playing career
Hayes made his debut in 1923 for Balmain against Western Suburbs at Pratten Park.  The following year, Hayes was a member of the Balmain side which won the 1924 premiership defeating South Sydney 3–0 in the grand final.  Hayes played with Balmain for another two seasons before joining Western Suburbs in 1927.  

Hayes spent two years at Wests and retired at the end of the 1928 season.  Hayes also played 11 times for New South Wales.

References

1902 births
Balmain Tigers players
Western Suburbs Magpies players
New South Wales rugby league team players
Australian rugby league players
Rugby league players from Sydney
Rugby league second-rows
Year of death missing